is one of the eight wards of Niigata City, Niigata Prefecture, in the Hokuriku region of  Japan. , the ward had an estimated population of 68,413 in 27,027 households and a population density of 913 persons per km².

Geography
Kōnan-ku is located in an inland region of north-central Niigata Prefecture, near the centre of Niigata City, directly south of the central Chūō-ku. The ward is bordered by Agano River, Koagano River, Shinano River, and the Nihonkai-Tōhoku Expressway.

Neighboring municipalities/wards
Niigata Prefecture
Kita-ku, Niigata
Higashi-ku, Niigata
Chūō-ku, Niigata
Akiha-ku, Niigata
Minami-ku, Niigata
Nishi-ku, Niigata
Agano

History
The area of present-day Kōnan-ku was part of ancient Echigo Province. The modern town of Kameda and the village of Yokogoshi were established on April 1, 1889 within Nakakanbara District, Niigata with the establishment of the municipalities system..

Yokogoshi was raised to town status on November 1, 1996. The city of Niigata annexed Kameda and Yokogoshi on March 21, 2005.

Education
Kōnan-ku has 11 public elementary schools and six public middle schools operated by the Niigata city government. There is one public high school operated by the Niigata Prefectural Board of Education (Niigata Kōyō High School), and one private combined middle/high school (Niigata Meikun High School).

Transportation

Railway
 JR East -  Shin'etsu Main Line

Transit bus
 Transit bus operated by Niigata Kotsu
 S2 / S6 / S7 / S8 / S9

Highway

Local attractions
 Northern Culture Museum
 AEON Mall Niigata Minami, shopping center

References

External links

 Niigata official website 
 Niigata Kōnan-ku website 
 Welcome to Konan Ward - Niigata City 
 Niigata City Official Tourist Information (multilingual)
 Niigata Pref. Official Travel Guide (multilingual)

Wards of Niigata (city)